TBC may refer to:

Education
 Trinity Bible College in North Dakota, US
 Tauranga Boys' College, a state secondary school in Tauranga, New Zealand

Companies
 Triangle Brewing Company of Durham, North Carolina, US
 Tram et Bus de la CUB (TBC), now Transports Bordeaux Métropole, the operator of three tram lines and a bus network in Bordeaux, France
 TBC Bank, a private bank in Republic of Georgia
 TBC Corporation, parent company of National Tire and Battery and other tire retailers and distributors
 The Beistle Company of Shippensburg, Pennsylvania, US
 The Boring Company of Elon Musk, in California, US

Medicine 
 Tuberculosis, lethal, infectious disease common before World War II

Radio and television
 Tanzania Broadcasting Corporation, official Tanzanian broadcaster known as TBC
 Taegu Broadcasting Corporation, a South Korean local broadcasting company
 Tohoku Broadcasting Company, a Sendai, Japan, TV/radio station
 Tonga Broadcasting Commission
 Tongyang Broadcasting Company, 1964–1980, a defunct South Korean broadcasting company
 Triad Broadcasting Company

Music
 The Black Crowes, a blues based rock band
 TBC (band), a Christian band
 Texas Boys Choir, a boychoir located in Fort Worth, Texas, US

Other uses 
 To be confirmed
 To be continued
 4-tert-Butylcatechol, an antioxidant
 The Beijing Center for Chinese Studies, organization aiming at educating the academic community about China
 World of Warcraft: The Burning Crusade, the first expansion pack for World of Warcraft 
 Thermal barrier coating, advanced materials systems usually applied to metallic surfaces operating at elevated temperatures, as a form of exhaust heat management
 Time base corrector,  technique to reduce or eliminate errors caused by mechanical instability present in analog recordings
 Transcending Boundaries Conference, north-east US LGBTQI convention
 Treasury Board of Canada
 Tuba City Airport, Arizona IATA airport code
 Tucson Bird Count, a community-based biological monitoring program in Tucson, Arizona, US
The Brothers Chaps, American writers, voice actors, directors, producers and composers
 True Blue Crew, Australian far-right white supremacist group
 TBC domain, a protein domain named for its initial discovery in the proteins Tre-2, Bub2, and Cdc16